The USA Track & Field Championships  may refer to:

USA Outdoor Track and Field Championships
USA Indoor Track and Field Championships